Kulu Shaw Boe District is one of 17 districts of Sinoe County, Liberia. As of 2008, the population was 8,555.

References

Districts of Liberia
Sinoe County